In retail economics and geography, comparison goods are products which are usually higher value and purchased infrequently, such as vehicles, household goods or clothing. Consumers tend to compare products before purchasing them to maximise value and quality. They are contrasted with convenience goods, which are purchased frequently and are usually low value (such as food). Shops offering comparison goods are often clustered in central business districts or in out-of-town retail centres, where retailers can compete over their offers.

References 

Retail analytics
Shopping (activity)
Management cybernetics